Gasoline Alley or Gasoline Alley West is a hamlet in the Canadian province of Alberta within Red Deer County.

History 
With an estimated population of 2,349 living within 890 dwelling units at full build-out, Liberty Landing began developing in the west portion of Gasoline Alley in 2017. Show homes began marketing the residential community in September 2018. Due to high development fees associated with utility connections in the area, Red Deer County decided to designate the west portion of Gasoline Alley as a hamlet in order to facilitate franchise agreements that would reduce development fees. Red Deer County officially designated Gasoline Alley, inclusive of Liberty Landing, as a hamlet on October 2, 2018.

Geography 
Gasoline Alley's hamlet boundary comprises Highway 2 to the east, Township Road 374 (McKenzie Road) to the south, Range Road 275 to the west, and Waskasoo Avenue/Leva Avenue to the northwest.

References 

Hamlets in Alberta
Red Deer County